"In Public" is a song by American singer Kelis, featuring American rapper Nas, taken from the former's third studio album, Tasty (2003). It was released as the album's fourth and final single on April 4, 2005. Kelis co-wrote the song with its producer, Rockwilder.

Like previous singles "Trick Me" and "Millionaire", "In Public" was not released in the United States. Although no music video was filmed for the song, it managed to reach number 17 on the UK Singles Chart. The track was originally due to be released as a double A-side single with the track "Glow", although this did not happen and a reason for the change has never been given.

Critical reception
"In Public" was met with mixed reviews from music critics. Adam Webb of Yahoo! Music cited the song as one of Tastys highlights, stating that it "espouses the delights of al fresco sex over a clinical electro beat and features a filthy rap courtesy of new husband Nas. Suffice to say it leaves Beyonce and Jay-Z sounding like Mary Whitehouse and Cliff Richard." Conversely, Andy Kellman of AllMusic viewed the track as one of the album's "miscues thwarting perfection" and advised listeners to skip past it.

The Guardians Dorian Lynskey described the song as "an eyebrow-raisingly explicit duet." The Independent opined, "For his part, Nas appears rather more flustered than he ever did in his accounts of life as a dope-dealing streetwise hustler." Pitchfork reviewer Scott Plagenhoef felt that the song is "possibly the low-point of what is often a transparent Beyoncé-aping full-length (starting with the cover art, which bares a striking resemblance to that of the "Crazy in Love" single)." Ernest Hardy of Rolling Stone commented that on "In Public", Kelis sounds like "Donna Summer with an action plan".

Commercial performance
"In Public" debuted and peaked at number 17 on the UK Singles Chart for the week ending April 16, 2005, ending Kelis' string of UK top-five singles. In Ireland, the single debuted and peaked at number 22 on the Irish Singles Chart on April 7, 2005. It also reached number 54 on the European Hot 100 Singles chart on April 23, 2005.

Track listing
CD single
"In Public" (radio edit) – 3:22
"Trick Me" – 3:26

Credits and personnel
Credits adapted from the liner notes of Tasty.

Recording
 Recorded at Mirror Image Recorders (New York City)
 Mixed at Enterprise Studios (Burbank, California)
 Mastered at Sterling Sound (New York City)

Personnel
 Kelis – vocals
 Nas – vocals
 Rockwilder – production
 Mike Koch – recording
 Dave Pensado – mixing
 Chris Athens – mastering

Charts

Release history

References

2003 songs
2005 singles
Kelis songs
Nas songs
Song recordings produced by Rockwilder
Songs written by Kelis
Songs written by Rockwilder
Virgin Records singles